Wacky Races: Crash and Dash is a 2008 racing video game based on the animated television series Wacky Races.

Gameplay
The game consists of three modes: Crazy Circuit, Wacky Race, and Trap Challenge. Crazy Circuit mode consists of completing six sets of races with four tracks each, Wacky Race allows a track unlocked in Crazy Circuit mode to be raced through, and Trap Challenge consists of playing through the traps set by Dastardly and Muttley during the races.

All racers from the cartoon are playable except Dastardly and Muttley, who aim to set traps during the race to slow the other racers down. Each vehicle is given four powerups to use to gain an advantage in the race, which are earned by collecting Mad Dash cogs. These are earned by finding them during the race or successfully completing the traps. At the end of the race, all vehicles sprint to the finish; those with the most Mad Dash cogs gain more speed.

Reception

The game received "generally unfavorable reviews" on both platforms according to the review aggregation website Metacritic.

References

External links
 
 

2008 video games
Eidos Interactive games
Kart racing video games
Nintendo DS games
Racing video games
Video games based on Hanna-Barbera series and characters
Video games developed in Sweden
Video games with 2.5D graphics
Video games with cel-shaded animation
Wii games
Multiplayer and single-player video games
Video games based on Wacky Races
Cartoon Network video games